"Muévelo" ("Move It") is a song by Mexican singer Sofía Reyes featuring Puerto Rican rapper and singer Wisin. It was Reyes' debut single, and it was released digitally via the iTunes Store by Warner Music Latina on August 22, 2014.

Track listing 
Digital download
 "Muévelo" -

Charts

Certifications

References 

 

2014 songs
Wisin songs
2014 debut singles
Sofía Reyes songs
Spanish-language songs
Song articles with missing songwriters